Qin Lizhen (1914–2007) was a Chinese diplomat. He served as the Chinese Ambassador to Norway between 1962 and 1965, Chinese Ambassador to Zambia between 1965 and 1972, Chinese Ambassador to Sweden between 1974 and 1979, and Chinese Ambassador to New Zealand between 1979 and 1983.

External links
http://www.fmprc.gov.cn/mfa_eng/ziliao_665539/wjrw_665549/3607_665555/3613_665567/t25383.shtml

1914 births
2007 deaths
Ambassadors of China to Norway
Ambassadors of China to Zambia
Ambassadors of China to Sweden
Ambassadors of China to New Zealand